Lilla Träslövs FF is a Swedish football club located in Varberg.

Background
Lilla Träslövs FF currently plays in Division 4 Halland which is the sixth tier of Swedish football. They play their home matches at the Östervi in Varberg.

The club is affiliated to Hallands Fotbollförbund. Lilla Träslövs FF played in the 2010 Svenska Cupen but lost 1–5 at home to Ramlösa Södra FF in the preliminary round.

Season to season

In their most successful period Lilla Träslövs FF competed in the following divisions:

In recent seasons Lilla Träslövs FF have competed in the following divisions:

Footnotes

External links
 Lilla Träslövs FF – Official website
 Lilla Träslövs FF on Facebook

Football clubs in Halland County
1931 establishments in Sweden